Fengxian Xincheng is a station  on Line 5 of the Shanghai Metro. Located at Baixiu Road and Jinhai Highway in the city's Fengxian District, the station is located on the main branch of Line 5 and opened as part of the southern extension of Line 5 on 30 December 2018. During the planning and construction stages, this station was known as Nanqiao Xincheng.

To the south, the tracks ascend above ground to the Pingzhuang rail yard. A future station named  is reserved between this station and the rail yard.

References 

Railway stations in Shanghai
Shanghai Metro stations in Fengxian District
Railway stations in China opened in 2018
Line 5, Shanghai Metro